The ISO 639 code gsw refers to the Alemannic varieties:

 Alsatian, Alemannic dialects spoken in most of Alsace
 Swiss German, Alemannic dialects spoken in the German-speaking part of Switzerland and some Alpine communities in Northern Italy